The traditional Korean calendar or Dangun calendar is a lunisolar calendar. Dates are calculated from Korea's meridian (135th meridian east in modern time for South Korea), and observances and festivals are based in Korean culture.

Koreans mostly use the Gregorian calendar, which was officially adopted in 1896. However, traditional holidays and age-reckoning for older generations are still based on the old calendar. The biggest festivals in Korea today, which are also national holidays, are Seollal, the first day of the traditional Korean New Year, and Chuseok its harvest moon festival. Other important festivals include Daeboreum also referred to as Boreumdaal (the first full moon), Dano (spring festival) and Samjinnal (spring-opening festival). Other minor festivals include Yudu (summer festival), and Chilseok (monsoon festival).

History
Like most traditional calendars of other East Asian countries, the Korean Calendar is derived from the Chinese calendar. The traditional calendar designated its years via Korean era names from 270 to 963, then Chinese era names with Korean era names at a few times until 1894. In 1894 and 1895, the lunar calendar was used with years numbered from the foundation of the Joseon Dynasty in 1392.

The Gregorian calendar was adopted on 1 January 1896, with Korean era name "Geon-yang (건양 / Hanja: 建陽, "adopting solar calendar")."

From 1945 until 1961 in South Korea, Gregorian calendar years were counted from the foundation of Gojoseon in 2333 BC (regarded as year one), the date of the legendary founding of Korea by Dangun, hence these Dangi (단기 / Hanja: 檀紀) years were 4278 to 4294. This numbering was informally used with the Korean lunar calendar before 1945 but has only been occasionally used since 1961, and mostly in North Korea prior to 1997.

Although not being an official calendar, in South Korea, the traditional Korean calendar is still maintained by the government.  The current version is based on Asia's Shixian calendar ("shi-heon-nyeok 시헌력 (時憲暦)" in Korean), which was in turn developed by Jesuit scholars.  However, because the Korean calendar is now based on the moon's shape seen from Korea, occasionally the calendar diverges from the traditional asian calendar by one day, even though the underlying rule is the same.  As a result, sometime the New Year's Day differ by one between the two countries, which last happened in 1997.

In North Korea, the Juche calendar has been used since 1997 to number its years, based on the birth of the state's founder Kim Il-sung.

Features 
 The Chinese zodiac of 12 Earthly Branches (animals), which were used for counting hours and years;
 Ten Heavenly Stems, which were combined with the 12 Earthly Branches to form a sixty-year cycle;
 Twenty-four solar terms (jeolgi / 절기, Hanja: 節氣) in the year, spaced roughly 15 days apart;
 Lunar months including leap months added every two or three years.

Weekdays 

Note that traditional Korean calendar has no concept of "weekdays": the following are names of weekdays in the modern (Western) calendar.

Months 

Additionally, the first, eleventh, and twelfth months have other Korean names which are similar to traditional Chinese month names. However, the other traditional Chinese month names, such as Xìngyuè ("apricot month") for the second month, are not used in Korean.

Festivals
The lunar calendar is used for the observation of traditional festivals, such as Seollal, Chuseok, and Buddha's Birthday. It is also used for jesa memorial services for ancestors and the marking of birthdays by older Koreans.

Traditional holidays

 
There are also many regional festivals celebrated according to the lunar calendar.

See also
Traditional Korean culture
Festivals of Korea
Korean era name
Sexagenary cycle
Public holidays in North Korea
Public holidays in South Korea

References

 Pyeon, Prof. M. Y. The Folkloric Study of Chopail (Buddha's Birthday). Seoul: Minsokwon, 2002.

Calendar
Specific calendars